The UniCredit Tower is a skyscraper in Milan, Italy. At , it is the tallest building in Italy. 

The building was designed by architect César Pelli and reached its full height on 15 October 2011 when the spire was attached. The building is the headquarters of UniCredit, Italy's largest bank by assets, and is part of a larger development of new residential and business structures in Milan's Porta Nuova district, near Porta Garibaldi railway station. The tower ranked eighth in the Emporis 2012, that rewards skyscrapers for excellence in their aesthetic and functional design.

Spire
The spire is entirely covered with LED lights, with the spire also having continuous night lighting. The colors can be varied according to event. For example, during the Christmas season of 2013 it was lit up green to represent a Christmas tree, while on the night between 14 and 15 June 2014 it was illuminated in red to celebrate the 150 years of the Italian Red Cross. One of the usual displays is that of the Italian flag. On the evening of 14 November 2015, the spire was illuminated with the colors of the French flag to represent Italy's condolences for the victims of the attack at Stade de France and at the Bataclan theatre in Paris, which had occurred the night before. On 13 June 2016, the tower was lit up with the colors of the rainbow flag in acknowledgement of the 49 victims of the Orlando nightclub shooting in Florida.

See also 
 List of tallest buildings in Italy
 List of tallest buildings in Milan
 List of tallest buildings in Europe
 Porta Nuova (Milan)

References

External links
 

Skyscrapers in Milan
Office buildings completed in 2011
César Pelli buildings
Skyscraper office buildings in Italy
UniCredit Group